Article 9 of the Japanese Constitution Referendum is a referendum that was expected to take place in 2020. In May 2017, then Japanese Prime Minister Shinzo Abe set a 2020 deadline for revising Article 9, which would legitimize the Japan Self-Defense Forces in the Constitution. Abe and his Cabinet resigned in September 2020, due to Abe's health problems.

Public opinion

See also
 2015 Japanese military legislation
 SEALDs

References

Further reading

2020 in Japanese politics
Referendums in Japan
Politics of Post-war Japan
Military of Japan
Constitutions of Japan
Pacifism in Japan
Shinzo Abe